Aleksandar Drenovak, born 30 December 1983 in Kraljevo is a Serbian middleweight boxer.

He lives in the Serbian spa town of  Vrnjačka Banja, in the Raška District of southwestern Serbia. He is trained by his father, a former boxer.

When Drenovak qualified for the 2012 Summer Olympics in London by placing fifth at the  2011 World Amateur Boxing Championships in Baku, Azerbaijan, Drenovak took Serbia back into the Olympic ring for the first time since 2000.

At the 2012 Olympics he beat Marlo Delgado from Ecuador, then lost 11:20 to Adem Kılıççı, eventually placing 13th in the event rankings.

In June 2015, Drenovak competed for Serbia at the first European Games in Baku. In March 2016 he was named Serbian National Boxing Champion: 75 kg middleweight.

References

External links
 
 Profile on Serbian Olympic Committee's site
 Interview (Wild Rooster) at London 2012 Olympic Games
 Interview (English) at London 2012 Olympic Games
 Homecoming Interview (English) after London 2012 Olympic Games
 
 Sportal.rs (Serbian) feature regarding Gillette Fusion ProGlide sponsorship
 
 
 
 
 
 
 

1983 births
Living people
Middleweight boxers
Olympic boxers of Serbia
Boxers at the 2012 Summer Olympics
Sportspeople from Kraljevo
Serbian male boxers
European Games competitors for Serbia
Boxers at the 2015 European Games